The Armistice of Cherasco was a truce signed at Cherasco, Piedmont, on 28 April 1796 between Victor Amadeus III of Sardinia and Napoleon Bonaparte. It withdrew Sardinia from the War of the First Coalition (leaving only Britain and Austria in the Coalition) and handed over Alessandria, Coni and Tortone to Republican France. Sardinia also handed over supplies and munitions to France and allowed its troops free passage through Piedmont. It was followed by a full  peace treaty signed in Paris the following 15 May, in which Sardinia handed over the county of Nice, the duchy of Savoy, Tende and Beuil to France, as well as guaranteeing free passage through its remaining territory for French troops.

Sources 

Vincent Cronin: Napoleón Bonaparte: Una biografía íntima, p. 131(2003).
Walter Scott: The life of Napoleon Bonaparte, p. 128 - 130, (1837).

1796 treaties
Armistices
Armistice of Cherasco
Peace treaties of the French Revolutionary Wars
France–Kingdom of Sardinia relations
Treaties of the Kingdom of Sardinia
Treaties of the French First Republic
1796 in Italy
1796 in France
18th century in the Kingdom of Sardinia
Cherasco